Beacon Hill, near Loughborough, in Leicestershire, England, is a popular country park. It is one of several beacon hills in the United Kingdom. It is part of Beacon Hill, Hangingstone and Outwoods Site of Special Scientific Interest.

Description

An extinct volcano, in Whitwick,  to the west, was responsible for the fine-grained igneous rocks that the hill consists of.  Beacon Hill was the site of a Bronze Age hill fort. Today a toposcope indicates landmarks which can be seen from the summit. These include Lincoln Cathedral and the hills of the Peak District.

Ratcliffe-on-Soar Power Station is aligned so that, seen from the summit, only two of its eight cooling towers are visible.

On a clear day Belvoir Castle can be seen as well as the hills in the Peak District. Derby, Nottingham, and the tower of  Lincoln Cathedral can be seen  with a pair of binoculars. You can also hear and see steam trains on the Great Central Railway which has stations at Loughborough, Quorn and Woodhouse.

It was featured on the 2005 TV programme Seven Natural Wonders as one of the wonders of the Midlands. There are some very interesting rocks on the summit.

Nearby are two small woods both accessible to the public.

The park has been awarded the Green Flag Award.

Native tree collection 
The park contains a collection of native trees, first planted in 1996. Many of the trees are labelled, and there are several boxes that provide audio commentary on the biology and historical interest of selected tree species at the push of a button.

Access 
There are car parks top and bottom, accessible from Beacon Road or Breakback Road, with a pay on exit barrier system, accepting cash and card. For access by public transport, buses between Leicester and Loughborough via Anstey serve Woodhouse Eaves.  Service 154 operated by Centrebus runs Monday to Friday and Kinchbus service 123 on Saturdays.

Features and activities 
Beacon Hill Country Park has picnic areas, walking routes, a barbecue site (seasonal), horse tracks and permanent orienteering markers. Each August the park opens for a country fair.

See also 
 Beacon Hill (disambiguation)

References

External links 

Beacon Hill Country Park
Photographs taken at Beacon Hill Country Park
Computer generated summit panorama Beacon Hill

Hills of Leicestershire
Country parks in Leicestershire
Hill forts in Leicestershire
Mountains and hills of the United Kingdom with toposcopes